The 1991 PBA season was the 17th season of the Philippine Basketball Association (PBA).

Board of governors

Executive committee
 Rodrigo L. Salud (Commissioner)
 Luis Lorenzo, Sr. (Chairman, representing Pepsi Hotshots)
 Wilfred Steven Uytengsu (Vice Chairman, representing Alaska Milkmen)
 Lance Gokongwei (Treasurer, representing Presto Tivolis)

Teams

Season highlights
The PBA Rookie draft was aired on TV live for the first time in league history. 
A PBA-China exhibition series took place during the pre-season from January 27 – February 3. The three PBA champions last year played the Liaoning basketball team which boast of three Beijing Asian Games veterans in a four-game series. Presto and Shell won over Liaoning but the Chinese cagers prevail against Purefoods in their third outing. Finally, a PBA All-Star selection won over Liaoning in their final assignment. 
Vintage sports commentator Joe Cantada covered his final game on TV during the April 9 replay of the controversial Shell-Purefoods game that took place on March 17.
An era in Philippine Basketball ended on April 21 when Virgilio "Baby" Dalupan resigned as head coach of Purefoods Hotdogs. Dalupan cited his difference with management as the reason for his resignation.
On May 19, Ginebra San Miguel made history in the PBA record books as the first team to come back from a 1–3 series deficit and beat Shell Rimula-X in game 7 of the best-of-seven 1st conference championship showdown. Rudy Distrito made a difficult baseline fadeaway shot against two Shell defenders with one second remaining to give Ginebra their third PBA title.
After the contract of Alvin Patrimonio with Purefoods expired in June, Pepsi Hotshots offered Patrimonio a P 25.3 million salary and a benefits package for  years, Purefoods matched Pepsi's multi-million peso contract to retain Patrimonio's services.
Due to numerous players requesting megabuck deals, the league initiated a "salary cap" starting the 1992 season. Swift, Shell, Alaska, Tivoli, Pepsi and Ginebra will have a P12 million cap while Purefoods and San Miguel will have a cap of P15 million.
Alvin Patrimonio of Purefoods won the season's Most Valuable Player award. The PBA Awards Night took place on December 19 at the ULTRA and it was billed as "Pasasalamat".
By the end of the season, Rudy Salud resigned as the commissioner of the league.

Opening ceremonies
The muses for the participating teams are as follows:

Champions
 First Conference: Ginebra San Miguel
 All-Filipino Conference: Purefoods Tender Juicy Hotdogs
 Third Conference: Alaska Milkmen
 Team with best win–loss percentage: Alaska Milkmen (31–25, .554)
 Best Team of the Year: Ginebra San Miguel (1st)

First Conference

Elimination round

Semifinal round

Third place playoffs 

|}

Finals

|}
Best Import of the Conference: Bobby Parks (Shell)

All-Filipino Conference

Elimination round

Semifinal round

Third place playoffs 

|}

Finals

|}

Third Conference

Elimination round

Semifinal round

Third place playoffs 

|}

Finals

|}
Best Import of the Conference: Wes Matthews (Ginebra)

Awards
 Most Valuable Player: Alvin Patrimonio (Purefoods)
 Rookie of the Year:  Eugene Quilban (Alaska)
 Most Improved Player: Ato Agustin (San Miguel)
 Mythical Five:
Jojo Lastimosa (Alaska)
Allan Caidic (Tivoli)
Ramon Fernandez (San Miguel)
Alvin Patrimonio (Purefoods)
Benjie Paras (Shell)
 Mythical Second Team:
Ronnie Magsanoc (Shell)
Ato Agustin (San Miguel)
Jerry Codiñera (Purefoods)
Alvin Teng (San Miguel)
Elpidio Villamin (Sarsi/Swift)
 All-Defensive Team:
Jerry Codiñera (Purefoods)
Glenn Capacio (Purefoods)
Alvin Teng (San Miguel)
Biboy Ravanes (Alaska)
Chito Loyzaga (Ginebra)

Cumulative standings

References

 
PBA